Weston-super-Mare, also known simply as Weston, is a seaside town in the North Somerset unitary area in the county of Somerset, England. It includes the suburbs of Mead Vale, Milton, Oldmixon, West Wick, Worlebury, Uphill and Worle. Its population at the 2021 census was 82,418. Since 1983, Weston has been twinned with Hildesheim in Germany.

The local area has been occupied since the Iron Age. It was still a small village until the 19th century when it developed as a seaside resort. A railway station and two piers were built. In the second half of the 20th century it was connected to the M5 motorway but the number of people holidaying in the town declined and some local industries closed, although the number of day visitors has risen.

Attractions include The Helicopter Museum, Weston Museum, and the Grand Pier. Cultural venues include The Playhouse, the Winter Gardens and the Blakehay Theatre.

The beach is sandy but low tide reveals areas of thick mud which are very dangerous to walk on. The mouth of the River Axe is at the south end of the beach. To the north of the town is Sand Point which marks the upper limit of the Bristol Channel and the lower limit of the Severn Estuary. This is also the site of the Middle Hope biological and geological Site of Special Scientific Interest (SSSI). In the centre of the town is Ellenborough Park, another SSSI due to the range of plant species found there.

Toponymy
Weston comes from the Anglo-Saxon for the west tun or settlement; super mare is Latin for "above sea"
and was added to distinguish it from the many other settlements named Weston in the Diocese of Bath and Wells.

Prior to 1348 it was known as Weston-juxta-Mare ("beside the sea"). The name was changed by Ralph of Shrewsbury, who was the Bishop of Bath and Wells. Between the 14th and 17th centuries the "super Mare" part of the name disappeared and it was just known as Weston, although in 1610 it was recorded as Weston on the More; môr being the Welsh word for sea.

History

Early history

Weston's oldest structure is Worlebury Camp, on Worlebury Hill, dating from the Iron Age. Castle Batch was a castle that once stood overlooking the town.

The parish was part of the Winterstoke Hundred.

The medieval church of St John was demolished in 1824 and rebuilt on the same site, though a stump of the medieval preaching cross survives by the exterior south wall. The former rectory is a 17th-century structure with later additions. Though it remains adjacent to the church, it has not been a parsonage house since the end of the 19th century. Today it is known as Glebe House and is divided into flats.

The Old Thatched Cottage restaurant on the seafront carries the date 1774; it is the surviving portion of a summer cottage built by the Revd. William Leeves of Wrington.

19th century

Early in the 19th century, Weston was a small village of about 30 houses, located behind a line of sand dunes fronting the sea, which had been created as an early sea wall after the Bristol Channel floods of 1607. The Pigott family of Brockley, who were the local Lords of the Manor, had a summer residence at Grove House. Weston owes its growth and prosperity to the Victorian era boom in seaside holidays. Construction of the first hotel in the village started in 1808; it was called "Reeves" (now the Royal Hotel). Along with nearby Burnham-on-Sea, Weston benefited from proximity to Bristol, Bath and South Wales. The first attempt at an artificial harbour was made in the late 1820s at the islet of Knightstone and a slipway built from Anchor Head towards Birnbeck Island.

Isambard Kingdom Brunel and his family lived in Weston, at Swiss Villa (towards the north end of Trevelyan road), while he was supervising the construction of the Bristol and Exeter Railway in the area. With the opening of the railway in 1841, thousands of visitors came to the town from Bristol, the Midlands and further afield, on works outings and bank holidays. Mining families also came across the Bristol Channel from South Wales by paddle steamer. To cater for them, Birnbeck Pier was completed in 1867, offering in its heyday amusement arcades, tea rooms, amusement rides and a photographic studio. It is now in a derelict state and has been added to English Heritage's Buildings at Risk Register, but visitors can still admire its structure from behind barbed wire. It was designed by Eugenius Birch with ironwork by the Isca Foundry of Newport, Monmouthshire. It is a grade II* listed building.

Large areas of land were released for development from the 1850s onwards. Large detached villas, for the middle classes, were built on the southern slopes of Worlebury Hill. Semi-detached and terraced housing was built on the low "moorland" behind the sea front in an area known as South Ward. Many of these houses have now been converted into bedsits. Most of the houses built in the Victorian era are built from stone and feature details made from Bath Stone, influenced by local architect Hans Price.

In 1885, the first transatlantic telegraph cable of the Commercial Cable Company was brought ashore and the company started a long association with the town, ending in 1962.

Guglielmo Marconi, the inventor of wireless telegraphy, successfully transmitted radio signals across the Bristol Channel in the spring of 1897, from Penarth (near Cardiff) to Brean Down (just south west of Weston, on the other side of the River Axe).

A second railway, the Weston, Clevedon and Portishead Light Railway, opened on 1 December 1897, connecting Weston to Clevedon. The terminus station was at Ashcombe Road. The railway was extended to Portishead on 7 August 1907 but was closed in 1940.

Architecture

Much of the character of the buildings in the town derives from the use of local stone, much of it from the Town Quarry. Notable among the architects working in the 19th century was Hans Price (1835–1912). Many examples of his work are still to be seen: the Town Hall, the Mercury Office, the Constitutional Club (originally the Lodge of St Kew), villas and numerous other domestic dwellings. The Odeon Cinema by Thomas Cecil Howitt is notable for fully retaining many Art Deco features both internally and externally, and retaining its original theatre organ, a Compton from 1935. It is believed to be the only cinema organ in the West Country left working in its original location and is still in regular use. Other organs by Compton in Weston-super-Mare can be found at Victoria Methodist Church and All Saints' Church by George Bodley (modelled on that in Downside Abbey).

20th century
Local traders, unhappy that visitors were not coming as far as the centre of the town, built a new pier closer to the main streets. Further development occurred after World War I, with the Winter Gardens Pavilion in 1927, the open air pool, with its arched concrete diving board, and an airfield dating from the inter-war period. Art Deco influences can be seen in much of the town's architecture from this period.

During World War II over 10,000 official evacuees were accommodated in the town, however only 130 spent four or more years in the town. The area was also home to war industries, such as aircraft and pump manufacture, and a Royal Air Force station at RAF Locking. The town was also on the return route of bombers targeting Bristol and was itself bombed by the Luftwaffe. The first bombs fell in June 1940, but the worst attacks were in January 1941 and in June 1942. Large areas of the town were destroyed, particularly Orchard Street and the Boulevard. On 3 and 4 January 1941, incendiary bombs fell on the town. The Air Ministry set up a "Q-station" decoy at Bleadon in an attempt to divert the bombers to an unpopulated area. In all 110 civilians lost their lives through enemy action in the borough. In the later part of the war, United States Army troops were billeted in the area, but they were relocated in the run-up to D-Day.

RAF Weston-super-Mare was opened in 1936 by No. 24 Group, with a single tarmac runway. It served as a flying candidates selection and initial training facility, and as a relief airport during World War II, latterly as the Polish Air Force Staff College from April 1944 to April 1946. After the war it served as a logistics supply station, with helicopter makers Westland Helicopters on site until closure in 1987. Today there is an operational heliport on site used occasionally by the RAF Search and Rescue service. The former Westland site, which closed in 2002, houses the Helicopter Museum featuring examples of Westland aircraft. Pride of place is given to an immaculate Westland Wessex HCC Mk.4, formerly of the Queen's Flight.

Residential areas outside the town centre include the Oldmixon, Coronation, and Bournville housing estates, built in the mid to late 20th century. Newer housing has since been built towards the east of the town in North Worle and Locking Castle, nearer to the M5 motorway.

Weston-super-Mare has expanded to include the established villages of Milton, Worle, Uphill, Oldmixon, West Wick and Wick St. Lawrence, as well as new areas such as St. Georges and Locking Castle.

In 1986, Weston General Hospital was opened on the edge of Uphill village, replacing the Queen Alexandra Memorial Hospital on The Boulevard, which was opened in 1928.

21st century

Around 2000, the town saw a growth in residential drug and alcohol rehabilitation treatment centres, with attendant crime and social problems. These problems were highlighted by Weston's councillors and newspapers, and by the Member of Parliament (MP), John Penrose during his maiden speech in the House of Commons in 2005. By 2009, Weston was home to around 11% of drug rehabilitation places in the UK, and North Somerset Council proposed an accreditation system examining the quality of counselling, staff training, transparency of referral arrangements, along with measures of the treatment's effectiveness and site inspections. By 2012, there had been a significant reduction in the number of rehabilitation facilities in the town, with the number of patient beds having nearly halved.

A structure known as Silica was installed at Big Lamp Corner during 2006. It is a piece of public art, an advertising sign, a retail kiosk selling newspapers and hot food, as well as a bus shelter. It has been criticised by local residents who liken it to a carrot or a space ship, although it is meant to symbolise man's harmony with the sea. This was part of North Somerset Council's ongoing civic pride initiative that has sought to revitalise Weston-super-Mare's public spaces, which had suffered a period of decline. Other public space improvements have been made throughout the town such as improvements to the street scene in Grove Park Village.

On 28 July 2008, the pavilion at the end of the Grand Pier was completely destroyed by a fire. Eleven fire engines and 80 firefighters could not contain the blaze, which is believed to have started in the north-east tower of the Pavilion. A competition was held to design a new pavilion, and the project was awarded to the winning architect Angus Meek Architects of Bristol. Construction work began on the pier and new pavilion in 2009, and it was scheduled to reopen in July 2010, after a £39 million rebuilding programme. After continuing problems and setbacks, with the pier not opening until a formal opening ceremony on 23 October 2010, the overall costs reached £51 million. During the same period there was a £34 million redevelopment of the promenade, including refurbishment of the Marine Lake and pedestrianisation of Pier Square. As part of the work, a scour protection apron and splash wall were added as part of flood prevention measures.

In March 2017 Weston-super-Mare was chosen as one of the 10 successful bids for the first phase of the creation of Heritage Action Zones (HAZ) a scheme where Historic England works with local partners in places with significant historic environment to use that heritage to help build economic growth and other opportunities in the locality. Over a three year period the Heritage Action Zone aimed to boost economic growth and researched Weston's heritage and urban development, by reviewing Weston's listed buildings, using aerial photographs, undertaking a historic characterisation of Weston-super-Mare, its land and sea environs and a report on the architecture of the town, which culminated with the publication of a new book Weston-super-Mare The town and its seaside heritage.

In November 2021, it was announced that North Somerset Council had agreed to purchase Birnbeck Pier from its owners and planned to restore it with additional funding from the Royal National Lifeboat Institution (RNLI), Historic England, and others.

Governance

Municipal history began in 1842 when a Local Act was obtained for "paving, lighting, watching, cleansing and otherwise improving the Town of Weston-super-Mare in the County of Somerset and for establishing a Market therein" under the jurisdiction of eighteen appointed Commissioners. Town Commissioners gave way to an Urban District Council in 1894, and then in 1937 the town received its Royal Charter as a municipal borough. In 1974, under the Local Government Act 1972, it was merged into the Woodspring district of the Avon County Council, and became a Charter trustees town. Weston-super-Mare regained its town council in 2000, becoming a civil parish. The island of Steep Holm is part of the civil parish of Weston-super-Mare.

Before 1 April 1974, Weston-super-Mare came under the administration of Somerset County Council. When Avon was split up in 1996, it became the administrative headquarters of the unitary authority of North Somerset, one of the successor authorities, which remains part of the ceremonial county of Somerset.

There are 11 electoral wards in Weston.

The MP for the Weston-super-Mare parliamentary constituency is John Penrose of the Conservative Party, who won the seat from Liberal Democrat Brian Cotter (now Lord Cotter)  in the 2005 General Election.

Geography

The mainly flat landscape of Weston is dominated by Worlebury Hill, 109 metres (357 ft), which borders the entire northern edge of the town, and Bleadon Hill, 176 metres (577 ft) which together with the River Axe, and Brean Down at Uphill form its southern border. In the centre of the town is Ellenborough Park a Site of Special Scientific Interest due to the range of plant species found there.
The beach of Weston Bay lies on the western edge of the town. The upper part is sandy, but the sea retreats a long way at low tide, exposing large areas of mud flats (hence the colloquial name of Weston-super-Mud). The tidal range in this part of the Bristol Channel is great, and since beach and mud flats are on a gentle slope, it is inadvisable to try to reach the sea at low tide, as the sand gives way to deep mud which has often resulted in loss of life over the years. Driving on the beach is permitted in certain areas, but occasionally the drivers are caught unawares as they drive too close to the sea and break through the sand into the underlying mud, and are then stuck.

This tidal movement contributes to the deposition of natural mud in bays such as Weston. There has been concern about pollution levels from industrial areas in Wales and at the eastern end of the Bristol Channel; however this tends to be diluted by the Atlantic waters. There are measurable levels of chemical pollutants, and little is known about their effects. Of particular concern are the levels of cadmium and to a lesser degree residual pesticides and hydrocarbons.

Just to the north of the town is Sand Point which marks the lower limit of the Severn Estuary and the start of the Bristol Channel. It is also the site of the Middle Hope  biological and geological Site of Special Scientific Interest.

Climate
Along with the rest of South West England, Weston has a temperate climate which is generally wetter and milder than the rest of the country. Seasonal temperature variation is less extreme than most of the United Kingdom because of the adjacent sea temperatures. In the summer the Azores high pressure affects the south-west of England, however convective cloud sometimes forms inland, reducing the number of hours of sunshine. Annual sunshine rates are slightly less than the regional average of 1,600 hours. In December 1998 there were 20 days without sun recorded at Yeovilton. Most of the rainfall in the south-west is caused by Atlantic depressions or by convection. Most of the rainfall in autumn and winter is caused by the Atlantic depressions, which is when they are most active. In summer, a large proportion of the rainfall is caused by sun heating the ground leading to convection and to showers and thunderstorms. About 8–15 days of snowfall is typical. November to March have the highest mean wind speeds, and June to August have the lightest winds. The predominant wind direction is from the south-west.

Demography
According to the United Kingdom Census 2011, the population of Weston-super-Mare is 76,143. This makes it the largest settlement in North Somerset, which has a total population of 188,564. 20.1% of the town's population are aged 65 or over, compared with the national average of 16.5%. By 2017 the population was estimated at 88,000.
96.5% of the population are white, compared with 86% nationally.
In 1831 the town population was 1,310, and in 1801 just 138. In 2001, the town comprised 34,441 households, while in 1829 it comprised just 250. The vast majority (96.5%) of the population described themselves as white in the 2011 census. 58.2% are Christian, with 32.4% describing themselves as having no religion. No other religious groups achieved as much as 0.5%.

Economy

Since the 1970s, Weston has suffered a decline in popularity as a holiday destination, as have most British seaside resorts, due to the advent of cheap foreign holidays and the demise of the traditional "works holidays" of heavy and manufacturing industries elsewhere in UK. The town had become a centre of industries such as helicopter production, and maintenance at the GKN Westland factory until its closure in 2002, however the company still retains a design office under the name GKN Aerospace Engineering Services at the Winterstoke Road site. Road transport links were improved with the M5 motorway running close by, and the town now supports light industries and distribution depots, including Lidl's distribution centre for its southern based stores, and is also a dormitory town for Bristol.  Vutrix, one of the largest semiconductor and video/audio distribution equipment companies in the television broadcasting industry, is based in the town. Two of the town's largest employers are the local council and Weston College, which has recently begun to offer university degrees as a secondary campus of Bath Spa University.

Tourism
Weston-super-Mare is a tourist destination, with its long sandy beach, Helicopter Museum, Weston Museum, Grand Pier and seasonal Wheel of Weston. A 2009 survey by Visit England placed the Grand Pier in the top ten free attractions in England. However, as of 2014, the pier charges for admission. On the Beach Lawns was a miniature railway operated by steam and diesel locomotives, which closed in 2012. The Paddle Steamer Waverley and MV Balmoral offer day trips from Knightstone Island to various destinations along the Bristol Channel and Severn estuary.

Since the 1970s the number of visitors staying for several nights in the town has decreased, but the numbers of day visitors has increased. In 1995 there were 4 million visitors but by 2005 this had risen to 5.3 million. In 2007 69% of visitors to the resort were day visitors, compared to 58% in 2005. The 2005 survey showed that day visitors stay in Weston-super-Mare for an average of six hours whilst overnight visitors stay for an average of five nights. The largest percentage of visitors (22%) were from the West Midlands. Weston was found to attract two distinct groups: "grey tourists" over the age of 60 and families with young children.

The Art Deco Tropicana, once a very popular lido on the beach, suffered years of neglect before closing to the public in 2000, and despite a number of attempts to reopen it, permission was given to demolish it in 2012. However, the complex reopened in 2015 and now serves as an events space, primarily hosting a seasonal amusement park and ice rink.

In July 2011, North Somerset Council gave planning approval to the £50 million Leisure Dome, a  indoor ski slope to be built on the site of RAF Locking. In 2015 the future of the project was in doubt because of the need for additional funding, and no mention of the LeisureDome proposals appear on the information provided by St. Modwen Properties, the developers about their plans for Locking Parklands as the site is now known. It was planned to include a  climbing wall, a vertical wind tunnel for indoor skydiving, indoor surfing, a BMX track, a health and fitness club, and a number of shops and restaurants. The ski slope will be the longest in the United Kingdom.

'International HeliDays', in association with the Helicopter Museum, are staged at the beach lawns over a long weekend around the end of July, when up to 75 helicopters from Europe fly in for a static display. There are frequent Helicopter Air Experience flights from the Museum heliport. There is also an annual display by the Red Arrows.

Weston Bike Nights are motorcycle meetings on the Promenade each Thursday during the summer. They are organised by The Royal British Legion Riders Branch to raise money for the Poppy Appeal.

Transport

Rail 

The Bristol and Exeter Railway arrived in Weston-super-Mare on 14 June 1841. A second larger station was constructed in 1866 to replace this, when planning permission was gained to create a loop station from the main line. After legal action was taken by residents along the proposed new route through issues of planning blight, the station on the current site was constructed in 1881.

Today, the station, which is on a short loop off the Bristol to Exeter line, is situated close to the town centre and less than ten minutes walk from the sea front. CrossCountry services run to Birmingham and the North. The station has two platforms. During the middle of the day they are served by the local trains between Taunton, Bristol and Cardiff, but during the peak periods London trains call at both stations. Weston Milton station is on the single track loop and therefore has only one platform, while Worle is on the main line and has two side platforms. The Weston loop diverges just to the southwest of Worle station, and the junction is therefore known as Worle Junction.

Tram 
The   gauge Weston-super-Mare Tramways network opened on 12 May 1902. The main route ran from Birnbeck Pier along the sea front to the Sanatorium (now Royal Sands); a branch line ran to the railway station and on to the tram depot in Locking Road. The fleet originally consisted of 12 double deck cars and 4 open-sided "toast rack" cars. The system was bought out by the competing bus company and closed on 18 April 1937, by which time the fleet comprised 8 double deck and 6 "toast racks". An earlier proposal for the Weston, Clevedon and Portishead Tramway to run along the streets of the town to the sea front had failed to materialise, leaving the line as an ordinary railway (the Weston, Clevedon and Portishead Light Railway) with a terminus in Ashcombe Road.

Road 
Weston is close to junction 21 of the M5 motorway, to which it is linked by a dual-carriageway relief road built in the 1990s. This replaced Locking Road as the designated A370 route and avoided some of the traffic congestion along that narrower urban road.

Bus 
Most local bus services are provided by First West of England. All services call at stops in the Regent Street and Big Lamp Corner area, including some stops in the adjacent High Street. Some town services and those to Sand Bay, Wells, Burnham-on-Sea and Bristol Airport start from or run via the main railway station. The service to Sand Bay is sometimes operated by an open top bus. National Express operate long distance coach services, mostly from the coach terminal in Locking Road Car Park which is close to the railway station. Bakers Dolphin previously operated a service to London but this was withdrawn in 2013.

The town had a bus station on the sea front from 1928 until 1987. After nine months of construction a new "bus hub" consisting of a street lined with bus stops was opened in February 2022. It is situated on Alexandra Parade.

Air 

Education

The Unitary authority of North Somerset, provides support for 78 schools, delivering education to approximately 28,000 pupils. 

Secondary education is provided by Broadoak Academy, Priory Community School, Winterstoke Hundred Academy, Worle Community School and Hans Price Academy. The town's main further education provider is Weston College, and the town's expanding higher education provision is supplied by University Centre Weston.

Nigel Leat, a teacher at Hillside First School, was jailed indefinitely in summer 2011 for paedophile offences that happened over a 14-year period. The school's headmaster lost his job in December 2011 due to the incident.

Culture

The town contains several arts venues. The Playhouse serves both tourists and the local population. The Winter Gardens on the seafront hosts shows, exhibitions and conferences. The Blakehay Theatre & Community Arts Centre is a small venue housed in a former Baptist church. All Saints Church hosts regular concerts, some of high national standing. This church is also used for recording, especially by the Emerald Ensemble and has featured on BBC TV programme Songs of Praise.

The Odeon Cinema was opened in 1935 and is a building in the modernist style designed by Thomas Cecil Howitt. It houses the only Compton theatre pipe organ in an Odeon cinema outside London and is one of only two working theatre organs left in the country still performing in their original location in commercially operating cinemas. This Compton organ was installed in 1935 and is the only one left in the West Country, the next nearest being the Odeon Leicester Square, London. All other models have been either restored and moved elsewhere, or destroyed. Occasional organ concerts continue to be held at the venue. The building has Grade II Listed status.

Weston-super-Mare has a small number of live music venues of note. "Scally's" hosts more established touring rock bands, while the "Brit Bar", "the Back Bar", "The London", and "The Imperial" hold regular open mic nights which attract a wide array of local musicians, as well as artists from further afield. The T4 on the Beach concert had been hosted annually since 2006, up until 2012, by Channel 4 youth programme T4. Well known bands and singers perform four or fewer of their hits. However, the vocals are mimed as the event is being produced for live TV broadcast. Each summer the beach is also used as the venue for the Weston-super-Mare Sand Sculpture Festival.

The town was the subject of a song "Sunny Weston-super-Mare" performed by local band The Wurzels. The last scenes of The Remains of the Day, a James Ivory film of 1993, were shot at locations in the town including the Grand Pier and the Winter Gardens.

The Weston Arts Festival takes place each year during September and October using local venues including the Blakehay Theatre, Playhouse, All Saints, and galleries and offering a wide range of cultural events.

Weston is also the final event on the November West Country Carnival circuit, when a large number of brightly illuminated floats called "carts" parade through the streets.

The town's weekly newspaper is The Weston & Somerset Mercury, which has been serving the population since 1843. It is now owned by publishing company Archant. There are also two online publications The Weston Echo, and Weston super Mare People.

Weston Super Television was an on-line community television channel set up in 2011.
Its volunteers make and present studio programmes, including interviews with local councillors, musicians and community leaders, as well as filming local events in and around the town.

The 2011–2013 Sky1 television comedy series The Café was co-written by Michelle Terry who was born in the town and the series was filmed in Weston-super-Mare.

In August 2015, the artist Banksy opened the temporary art installation Dismaland at the derelict  Tropicana venue.

In late 2019, a new community radio station  WaveWSM was also opened with studios in the centre of the town, bringing local internet radio to the town, with presenters and shows local to Weston as well as shows syndicated in from around the UK. The plan Is for a local breakfast show to start in January 2020.

In 2022, See Monster, a retired gas platform repurposed as an art installation, opened at the Tropicana as part of the national art festival Unboxed: Creativity in the UK. The installation was purported to be the first of its kind in the world. Its opening was preceded by three drone light shows by SkyMagic.

Landmarks

The Grand Pier is one of the most popular tourist attractions in the town. It houses funfair style attractions, a go-kart track, cafes, a fudge factory, and a host of arcade games, and underwent a £34 million re-development after a fire in 2008 destroyed the main pavilion. After a harsh winter which delayed progress, the new pier pavilion reopened on 23 October 2010.

Weston's first pier, Birnbeck Pier, standing on a small island to the north of the bay is currently closed to the public. The current owners, Manchester-based company Urban Splash purchased the pier in 2006. A competition was held as a means to encourage redevelopment of the site for commercial use. To date, no firm plans are in place, and the future of Birnbeck Pier is uncertain. The pier houses Weston-super-Mare Lifeboat Station.

Knightstone Island housed a theatre, swimming pool and sauna, after having been purchased by the physician Edward Long Fox in 1830 to create a therapeutic spa with range of hot, cold and chemical baths. After years of disrepair and dereliction, the area has been redeveloped by Redrow Homes. During 2006/2007, luxury apartments and commercial outlets have been built on the site. Consideration has been taken due to the listed building status of much of the site. Boat trips from here include the Waverley and Balmoral and trips to Steep Holm and Flat Holm islands as well as short trips around Weston Bay.

The Tropicana outdoor swimming pool that is located on the southern section of the sea front has not been occupied since 2000. A private developer, Henry Boot, was selected to redevelop the site with a new Life Station leisure complex, which was planned to include a six lane,  swimming pool, water park, 96-bed hotel, restaurant, eight-screen cinema, 14 retail units, and a 20-lane bowling alley. The redevelopment was beset by delays and controversy. A group of local residents challenged the council over its decision to appoint Henry Boot, asking to put forward their own proposals for the site. In November 2009, the plans were finally abandoned, leaving the future of the site uncertain. In 2010 the council invited submissions from developers for a new, less ambitious, scheme to redevelop the site with a swimming pool at its heart. A decision on a new scheme was expected towards the end of 2010. The local authority announced on 23 August 2011 that it was giving developers six months to propose plans for a smaller development otherwise they will arrange to demolish the Tropicana.
In February 2013, North Somerset Council granted planning permission to a consortium of local businesses who intend to build a new swimming pool complex on the site. The Tropicana is occupied by an amusement park called Funland during summer months, featuring a wild mouse roller coaster and several thrill rides. 

The First World War memorial in Grove Park, containing a sculpture by Alfred Drury, was unveiled in 1922, with additions by Walter Cave for the Second World War. It contains the names of 402 men from the area who fell in the First World War. It consists of a winged allegorical figure of Victory holding an olive branch, which stands on an octagonal column. The memorial is a grade II listed building.

Religious sites

Most of the town's churches and chapels are neo-Gothic 19th century structures. The Medieval village church of St John the Baptist was completely demolished in 1824 to make way for a new and larger place of worship. The Catholic St Joseph's Church was built in 1858 by Charles F. Hansom and extended in 1893 by Alexander Scoles.

All Saints Church was built between 1898 and 1902 to a design by George Frederick Bodley and completed by his pupil F. C. Eden in the 14th century style so favoured by Bodley. It is a Grade II* listed building. Holy Trinity Church, designed by H Lloyd and opened in 1861, is also Grade II*.

There is a Greek Orthodox Church of St Andrew the Apostle in Grove Road, Milton. Victoria Methodist Church was built in 1935–36 to replace an earlier church of 1899–1900, which was destroyed by fire in 1934.

Sport
Football team Weston-super-Mare A.F.C. play in the Southern Premier South at the purpose-built Woodspring Stadium, which opened in August 2004.

There are two rugby clubs in the town; Weston-super-Mare RFC, formed in 1875, and Hornets RFC, formed in 1962. Weston play in South West Premier league, whilst Hornets play in the Tribute South West 1 West league. These are national level 5 and level 6 respectively in the English rugby union system.

Somerset County Cricket Club played first class and one-day matches for one week a season on a pitch prepared at Clarence Park, near the sea front. This began in 1914 and continued until the last "festival" in 1996.
Weston-super-Mare Cricket Club play at Devonshire Park Ground.

The town is well known amongst motocross enthusiasts for staging the Weston beach race every autumn. In addition, races are also held for youth riders, sidecarcross riders and quad bike competitors.

Notable people

Notable current and former residents of the town include:

 Aaron Allard-Morgan: winner of Big Brother 2011 (UK)
 A. V. Alexander, 1st Earl Alexander of Hillsborough: Minister of Defence in the Attlee government, raised in Weston-super-Mare
 Jeffrey Archer: author, politician and convicted perjurer
 Jhonn Balance: musician, founding member of Psychic TV and founder of Coil (band)
 Ritchie Blackmore: guitarist and founding member of Deep Purple, Rainbow and Blackmore's Night.
 Peter Christopherson: musician, founding member of Throbbing Gristle and Psychic TV
 John Cleese: actor and member of Monty Python
 Roald Dahl: Welsh children's author, attended St Peter's School from 1925–1929. 
 Jill Dando: murdered broadcaster and journalist, after whom the sixth form centre at Weston College and a garden in Grove Park are named
 Arthur Stanley Eddington: one of the foremost astrophysicists of the early 20th century, grew up in the town
 Henry Edwards, film actor, director and producer
 Daphne Fowler: game show champion
 Baron Glanely (William Tatem), ship- and racehorse-owner, died during an air raid at 16 Malvern Road in June 1942.
 Rupert Graves: actor, born and educated in the town 30 June 1963
 Bob Hope: comedian and actor, lived there as a child
 Sean Martin: writer and film director
 Con O'Neill: actor
 John Oldmixon (1673–1742): historian; born in Oldmixon
 The Revd. Dr John Polkinghorne: particle physicist and theologian.
 Hans Price: (1835–1912) architect; responsible for much of the Victorian architecture which gives the town its distinctive character
 Paulo Radmilovic: Olympic gold medal athlete
 Gareth Taylor: footballer; born 25 February 1972 in the town
 Michelle Terry: actress and writer
 Peter Trego: cricketer

References

Further reading

||

Brodie, Allan, Roethe, Johanna and Hudson-McAulay, Kate (2019). Weston-super-Mare: the town and its seaside heritage (Swindon: Historic England) 
Brodie, Allan and Johanna Roethe (2020) Weston-super-Mare, North Somerset: historical and architectural development (Historic England Research Report Series 1/2020), 2 volumes. ISSN 2059-4453 (Online)

Poole, Sharon (1995). Weston-super-Mare. A pictorial history. Phillimore. ISBN 978-0-85033-969-7.
Poole, Sharon (2002). Weston-super-Mare. Tempus History & Guide. The History Press. ISBN 978-0-7524-2631-0.
Roethe, Johanna (2019). 'Weston-super-Mare. A Victorian seaside town' Historic England Research 13 (August 2019).

External links

 Weston-super-Mare town council
 Official Tourist Website for Weston-super-Mare
WaveWSM Bringing unity to the community

 
Towns in North Somerset
Civil parishes in Somerset
Ports and harbours of Somerset
Seaside resorts in England
Populated coastal places in Somerset
Beaches of Somerset